J. Sterling Morton High School East Auditorium, also known as Chodl Auditorium, is a Beaux-Arts building in Cicero, Illinois that was built in 1925.  It was listed on the National Register of Historic Places in 1983. With a seating capacity of 2,545 the Chodl Auditorium was a popular place for community events and high school productions. It was the largest high school auditorium and non-commercial stage in the state. The stage, in fact, was big enough to serve as a regulation basketball floor. Theatrical productions were staged in the fall and spring when gym classes were held outside.

On September 18, 2013, the Chicago Symphony Orchestra performed their 2013 Community Concert at Chodl Auditorium. More than 2,000 individuals attended the concert, including Illinois Lieutenant Governor Sheila Simon and local dignitaries.

References

Beaux-Arts architecture in Illinois
School buildings completed in 1925
Cicero, Illinois
Buildings and structures on the National Register of Historic Places in Cook County, Illinois
School buildings on the National Register of Historic Places in Illinois
1925 establishments in Illinois